The Illinois Appellate Court is the court of first appeal for civil and criminal cases rising in the Illinois Circuit Courts.  Three Illinois Appellate Court judges hear each case and the concurrence of two is necessary to render a decision.  The Illinois Appellate Court will render its opinion in writing, in the form of a published opinion or an unpublished order.  As of 1935, decisions of the Illinois Appellate Court became binding authority upon lower courts in Illinois.

The Illinois Appellate Court has 52 judges serving five districts.  The majority of the judges (18 in the First District, and between seven and nine in each of the Second, Third, Fourth, and Fifth Districts) are elected, with the remaining judges having been appointed by the Supreme Court of Illinois.

Civil cases appealed from the Illinois Appellate Court are heard by the Supreme Court of Illinois upon the grant of a Petition for Leave to Appeal under Illinois Supreme Court Rule 315, a Certificate of Importance under Illinois Supreme Court Rule 316, or a Petition for Appeal as a Matter of Right under Illinois Supreme Court Rule 317.  The same rules apply to criminal cases.

First District
The First District is based in Chicago and hears cases arising in Cook County.  It is divided into six divisions, each with four different judges.  The First District clerk's office, and the principal seat of the court are located in the Michael Bilandic Building, at 160 North LaSalle Street, Chicago, IL 60601.

Second District
The Second District is based in Elgin and hears cases arising in 13 counties in northern Illinois (Boone, Carroll, DeKalb, DuPage, Jo Daviess, Kane, Kendall, Lake, Lee, McHenry, Ogle, Stephenson, and Winnebago).  The Second District has nine judges.  The Second District clerk's office is located at Appellate Court Building, 55 Symphony Way, Elgin, IL 60120.

Third District
The Third District is based in Ottawa and hears cases arising in 21 counties in central Illinois (Bureau, Fulton, Grundy, Hancock, Henderson, Henry, Iroquois, Kankakee, Knox, LaSalle, Marshall, McDonough, Mercer, Peoria, Putnam, Rock Island, Stark, Tazewell, Warren, Whiteside, and Will).  The Third District has seven judges.  The Third District clerk's office is located at 1004 Columbus Street, Ottawa, IL 61350.

The Third District is based in Ottawa, IL and hears cases arising in 7 counties in Illinois (Dupage, Will, Kankakee, Iroquois, Grundy, Lasalle, and Bureau Counties.

https://www.illinoiscourts.gov/courts/appellate-court/districts-third-district/

Fourth District

The Fourth District is based in Springfield and hears cases arising in 30 counties in central Illinois (Adams, Brown, Calhoun, Cass, Champaign, Clark, Coles, Cumberland, DeWitt, Douglas, Edgar, Ford, Greene, Jersey, Livingston, Logan, Macon, Macoupin, Mason, McLean, Menard, Morgan, Moultrie, Piatt, Pike, Sangamon, Schuyler, Scott, Vermillion, and Woodford).  The Fourth District has seven judges.  The Fourth District clerk's office is located at 201 West Monroe Street, Springfield, IL 62794.

As of 1/1/22 due to redeistricting, fourth district is now: The Fourth District Appellate Court is located in Springfield and hears cases appealed from trial courts in 41 counties (Adams, Boone, Brown, Calhoun, Carroll, Cass, Ford, Fulton, Greene, Hancock, Henderson, Henry, Jersey, Jo Daviess, Knox, Lee, Livingston, Logan, Macoupin, Marshall, Mason, McDonough, McLean, Menard, Mercer, Morgan, Ogle, Peoria, Pike, Putnam, Rock Island, Sangamon, Schuyler, Scott, Stark, Stephenson, Tazewell, Warren, Whiteside, Winnebago and Woodford). taken from Ill Supr court site.

Fifth District
The Fifth District is based in Mount Vernon and hears cases arising in 37 counties in southern Illinois (Alexander, Bond, Christian, Clay, Clinton, Crawford, Edwards, Effingham, Fayette, Franklin, Gallatin, Hamilton, Hardin, Jackson, Jasper, Jefferson, Johnson, Lawrence, Madison, Marion, Massac, Monroe, Montgomery, Perry, Pope, Pulaski, Randolph, Richland, St. Clair, Saline, Shelby, Union, Wabash, Washington, Wayne, White, and Williamson).  The Fifth District has seven judges.  The Fifth District clerk's office is located at 14th & Main Street, Mount Vernon, IL 62864.

See also 
 Judiciary of Illinois

References

External links
 Official homepage of the Illinois Appellate Court

Illinois state courts
State appellate courts of the United States
1877 establishments in Illinois
Courts and tribunals established in 1877